The 2011 IIHF World Women's Championships was held in April 2011 in Zürich and Winterthur, Switzerland, and took place at Hallenstadion and Deutweg rink. This was the 13th women's championship run by the International Ice Hockey Federation (IIHF). The United States were the defending champions and defended their title, capturing their third straight gold medal by defeating Canada 3–2 in overtime on a goal by Hilary Knight. IIHF council member Monique Scheier-Schneider presided over the events.

Top Division

Preliminary round
All times local (CEST/UTC+2)

Group A

Group B

Relegation series

Best of three.

All times local (CEST/UTC+2)

Final round

Quarterfinals

Semifinals

5th place playoff

Bronze medal game

Gold medal game

Scoring leaders
List shows the top 10 skaters sorted by points, then goals.

GP = Games played; G = Goals; A = Assists; Pts = Points; +/− = Plus/minus; PIM = Penalties In MinutesSource: IIHF.com

Leading goaltenders
Only the top five goaltenders, based on save percentage, who have played 40% of their team's minutes are included in this list.
TOI = Time on ice (minutes:seconds); SA = Shots against; GA = Goals against; GAA = Goals against average; Sv% = Save percentage; SO = ShutoutsSource: IIHF.com

Tournament Awards
Media All-Stars
Goaltender: 
Defense: , 
Most Valuable Player: 
 Best players selected by the directorate:
Best Goaltender: 
Best Forward: 
Best Defenceman: 

Best players of each team
Best players of each team selected by the coaches.

Division I

The following teams took part in the Division I tournament which was held in Ravensburg, Germany, from April 11 to April 16. The winner of the group was promoted to the Top Division for the 2012 championships, while the last-placed team in the group was relegated to Division II.

On March 29, 2011 Japan withdrew from the tournament due to the 2011 Japan earthquake.  They retained their position in 2012's Division I, and the 5th placed team was relegated.

 was promoted to Top Division for the 2012 IIHF Women's World Championship.  was relegated to Division II (renamed Division I B).

Division II

The following teams took part in the Division II tournament which was held in Caen, France. The winner of the group, Czech Republic was promoted to Division I for the 2012 championships, while the last-placed team in the group, North Korea was relegated to Division III. Prior to the start of the tournament the North Korean national team announced they would withdraw, citing financial reasons. All games against them were counted as a forfeit, with a score of 5–0 for the opposing team.

 was promoted to Division I A for the 2012 IIHF Women's World Championship.  was relegated to Division III (renamed Division II A).

Division III

The following teams took part in the Division III tournament which was held in Newcastle, Australia. The winner of the group, Netherlands was promoted to Division II for the 2012 championships, while the last-placed team in the group, Belgium was relegated to Division IV.

 was promoted to Division II (renamed I B) for the 2012 IIHF Women's World Championship.  was relegated to Division IV (renamed II B).

Division IV

The following teams took part in the Division IV tournament which was held in Reykjavík, Iceland, from March 29 to April 4.

 was promoted to Division III (renamed II A) for the 2012 IIHF Women's World Championship.  should have been relegated to Division V (renamed II B Qualification) but were not.

Division V

The following teams took part in the Division V tournament which was held in Sofia, Bulgaria, from March 14 to March 20.

 was promoted to Division IV (renamed II B) for the 2012 IIHF Women's World Championship.  In addition, because of some nations not participating,  instead of hosting the Division II B Qualification, effectively were promoted as well.

References

External links 
 Official website
 IIHF Official Site
 Complete results in French

 
IIHF Women's World Ice Hockey Championships
World
World
2011 IIHF Women's World Championship
April 2011 sports events in Europe
Women's ice hockey in Switzerland
2011 in Swiss women's sport
Winterthur
Sports competitions in Zürich
21st century in Zürich